Skenella wareni is a species of minute sea snail, a marine gastropod mollusk in the family Cingulopsidae.

Distribution

Description 
The maximum recorded shell length is 1.64 mm.

Habitat 
Minimum recorded depth is 15 m. Maximum recorded depth is 24 m.

References

External links

Cingulopsidae
Gastropods described in 1994